The state of Georgia offers many specialty or optional license plates, most at an extra cost to motorists. Plates are also issued for non-passenger vehicles, such as trucks, school buses, and governmental vehicles.

"...on my mind" base
A number of types were issued on the 1998-dated "...on my mind" base, using the same general design as the standard passenger plates of the era.

Unique designs
During this time period, a number of types were also issued using unique designs:

Non-passenger and specialty plates, 1990 to 1996
A number of types were issued on the 1990-dated base, using the same general design as the standard passenger plates of the era.

During this time period, a number of plates were issued using unique designs.

1983 to 1989
A number of types were issued on the 1983-dated base, using the same general design as the standard passenger plates of the era.

During this time period, a number of plates were issued using unique designs.

December 2003 to present

The state streamlined the ever-growing number of limited-issuance plates by instituting two-letter prefixes for almost all types other than standard passenger plates.

For most types, the serial format progresses after the two-letter prefixes in the following sequence: 0, 00, 000, 0000, 000A, 00A0, 0A00, 00AA, 0AAA, and 0AA0.

Many of these plate types first appeared on the www.GEORGIA.gov base in December 2003 or later, but beginning in the first quarter of 2007, some types began transitioning to the GEORGIA.gov base, with nearly all types having made the transition by the first quarter of 2008. On the new base, the county sticker box and remaining (right) year sticker box were removed.

Current types not displaying a prefix

Pending types

External links
Georgia Department of Revenue listing of some available plates
LicensePlates.cc current license plate sightings from Georgia
Plateshack.com gallery of Georgia plates 1
Plateshack.com gallery of Georgia plates 2
Plateshack.com gallery of Georgia plates 3

Georgia Non-passenger
Transportation in Georgia (U.S. state)